Kevin Kilmurray (1950 – 4 December 2022) was an Irish Gaelic footballer who played for his local club Daingean and at senior level for the Offaly county team from 1969 until 1980.

Kilmurray was from Daingean, County Offaly.

Kilmurray managed the Offaly senior football team from November 2004 until 2006. He had two championship seasons in charge, most notably steering Offaly to the 2006 Leinster SFC final. That remained Offaly's most recent appearance there at the time of his death.

Kilmurray's death was announced on 4 December 2022; he had reached the age of 72. He was the fifth member of the 1971–72 Offaly team to die, following Larry Coughlan, Kieran Claffey, Mick O'Rourke and Paddy Fenning.

Honours
Belcamp College
Leinster Colleges Senior Football Championship: 1967, 1968

University College Dublin
All-Ireland Senior Club Football Championship: 1974, 1975
Leinster Senior Club Football Championship: 1973, 1974
Dublin Senior Football Championship: 1973, 1974
Sigerson Cup: 1973, 974

Civil Service
Dublin Senior Football Championship: 1980

Offaly
All-Ireland Senior Football Championship: 1971, 1972
Leinster Senior Football Championship: 1969, 1971, 1972, 1973, 1980
Leinster Under-21 Football Championship: 1971

References

1950 births
2022 deaths
Daingean Gaelic footballers
Gaelic football managers
Offaly inter-county Gaelic footballers
UCD Gaelic footballers